Ink Pixel Films is an English film production company founded by several British actors and directors in 2010.

Following the completion of On the Ropes in September 2011, a press release announced that Ink Pixel Films had signed a distribution deal with Cornerstone Media International to produce a further two feature films.

Filmography

Other
 The Ultimate Roy Shaw Collection (2010) (Graphics)
 Football Hooligans (2010) (Graphics)
 The Gangster Collection (2010) (Graphics)

References

External links
 On the Ropes on The British Film Council
 Shaniqua on The British Film Council
 the n00bs on The British Film Council
http://kingloaf.com/on-the-ropes-announce-exclusive-premier-in-december-at-the-luxe-cinema/
http://www.theluxecinema.com/content/ropes-cert-tbc

Film production companies of the United Kingdom
Entertainment companies established in 2010